Jørgen Beck (13 December 1914 – 5 October 1991) was a Danish film actor. He appeared in 32 films between 1945 and 1978. He was born in Roskilde, Denmark and died in Denmark.

Selected filmography
 Hvad vil De ha'? (1956)
 Pigen og vandpytten (1958)
 Vi er allesammen tossede (1959)
 Vi har det jo dejligt (1963)
 Sikke'n familie (1963)
 Once There Was a War (1966)
 The Man Who Thought Life (1969)

External links

1914 births
1991 deaths
Danish male film actors
People from Roskilde
20th-century Danish male actors